Tenjin may be:

 Tenjin (kami), the Shinto kami (spirit) of scholarship
 Tenjin, Fukuoka, Japan, the downtown region of the city
 Tenjin Station, a subway station
 Tenjin River, in Tottori Prefecture, Japan
 Tenjin Beach, a recreational beach on Lake Inawashiro in Fukushima Prefecture, Japan
 Hidetaka Tenjin (born 1973), Japanese mecha anime artist and science-fiction illustrator
 Umi Tenjin, Japanese voice actress

Japanese-language surnames